Vitolo Kulihaapai was a king of Uvea, ruling from 1918 until 1924.  He was preceded by Sosefo Mautāmakia II, and succeeded by Tomasi Kulimoetoke I.

References

Wallis and Futuna monarchs